Budkov is the name of several locations in the Czech Republic:

 Budkov (Prachatice District), a village in the South Bohemian Region
 Budkov (Třebíč District), a village in the Vysočina Region